Barbara Blackburn was an American typist and writer, best known for achieving the Guinness World Record for the world's fastest typist. Her peak speed was 212 WPM on a Dvorak keyboard.

In 1980, she maintained a sustained typing speed of 150 WPM for 50 minutes. By 1984, She had achieved 170 WPM on minute tests. Her typographic error frequency is 0.002%.

After Blackburn's recruitment as a Dvorak typing demonstrator, Blackburn became a supporter of the Dvorak keyboard, stating, "It makes much more sense than the standard, so-called QWERTY keyboard." 

Since 1984, her peak typing speed has been beaten on multiple occasions.

Early life 
Sources do not indicate Blackburn's birth year, birthplace, or birth surname.

Blackburn attended high school in Pleasant Hill, Missouri. She graduated third in her class of 46 students, held back only due to her I-minus (Inferior) grade in typing. Blackburn referred to her typing class as the "bane of [her] existence," due to its use of the QWERTY keyboard.

Typing 
In 1938, while a freshman at business college, a Royal Typewriter Company representative recruited her as a demonstrator of the Dvorak typewriter. At the time, she was a skilled bookkeeper and stenographer.

After graduating college she brought her Dvorak typewriter to each of her workplaces.

In 1939, Blackburn started work as a legal secretary. She left the firm in 1945, later stating she  left "with the reputation as the best legal secretary in Kansas City."

In 1945, she began work at an electronics company, beginning as an office manager and later becoming a sales engineer. She demonstrated speed typing at the Canadian National Exhibition and the Canadian Educational Conference, which led to her inclusion in the Guinness Book of World Records circa 1982, where she is credited as "Mrs. Barbara Blackburn of Everett, Wash."

In 1984, she starred in a commercial for the Apple IIc, which offered a switchable Dvorak-QWERTY keyboard, captioned as "World's Fastest Typist." She explains how she achieved the Guinness World Record for fastest typist at barely 150 words a minute, yet she was able to type 200 WPM on an Apple computer.

Letterman controversy 
In 1984, while in New York to tape the Apple IIc commercial, Blackburn starred on the David Letterman Show's January 24, 1985 episode. 

During the episode, Letterman pitted Blackburn against his production assistant Barbara Gaines, most likely as a surprise to Blackburn. He challenged both to type for a minute on an IBM Selectric, copying from The Official Professional Baseball Rules Book. Afterwards, he presented a paper incomprehensible with typos, claiming it was Blackburn's. Letterman then crowned his production assistant, Gaines, the fastest typist in the world. When Letterman asked what happened, an uncomfortable Blackburn claimed the typewriter had been tampered with, as it was functional the day before.

On a January 28, 1985 broadcast, Letterman brought a small panel to figure out what had occurred, standing them before a large image of Blackburn. A Manhattan Office Products typewriter repairman had inspected the typewriter and claimed it was in good working order. The former secretary of the New York State Polygraph Association claimed Blackburn was stressed during the competition, which Letterman used to imply Blackburn was incompetent. Finally, a United States Navy Lieutenant "decoded" Blackburn's typographic errors using a substitution cypher. He explained that the left hand's letters were typed correctly while the right hand's letters had been displaced one key to the right. A footage replay showed that Blackburn had transferred her hand one to the right.

Blackburn later denounced the episode, stating that it was an insult to her skills. She had expected a serious demonstration, not a comedy routine. She particularly was shocked at the January 28th segment in which the panel of men imply her incompetence. She stated:That he is still running it about every year completely astounds me! I have a complete tape of all of my TV appearances during my publicity reign, but I REFUSE TO WATCH THE LETTERMAN FIASCO.

Later life 
Blackburn worked in the word processing department of State Farm Insurance in Salem, Oregon until her retirement in 2002.

Blackburn died in April 2008.

See also 

 August Dvorak
 Steve Wozniak, Apple computer engineer and supporter of the Dvorak keyboard

References 

2008 deaths
American women writers
Guinness World Records
Typing
Keyboard layouts